Madly may refer to:
 The Love Mates, or Madly, a 1970 French romance film
 Madly (2016 film), an English-language international anthology film
 Madly, a song by F.T. Island from the EP The Mood